Michael Hoppé is an English musician, composer, and record producer. In the early 1980s, he was head of A&R for PolyGram Records and signed new-age artists including Vangelis, Jean Michel Jarre, and Kitaro as well as resigning ABBA and the Who.

Biography
Hoppé lives in San Miguel de Allende, Mexico. He is the grandson of Emil Otto Hoppé, and many of his albums feature Emil's photography.

Michael Hoppé was a senior executive at PolyGram. In 1984, Hoppé left PolyGram to focus on composing, published by his company Chordially Yours Music, and working as a music consultant for InterConnection Resources in Los Angeles. His discography contains more than 30 new age and classical albums. Hoppe says his music is best described as heart music and is often used for healing and meditation. In 2003, his album Solace was nominated for a Grammy Award for Best New Age Album. The Yearning was named "CD of the Year" by CD Review. His music has been featured in film and television such as The Sopranos, The Oprah Winfrey Show, Misunderstood starring Gene Hackman, Michael Moore's Sicko, and the multi award-winning short film Nous Deux Encore, featured on his album Tapestry. Hoppe's next release Grace (2013) featured work by his daughter, the photographer Rebecca Hoppe. She also designed the cover for Serenity (2014), a collection of improvisations for viola, performed by Harold Moses, and keyboards. Nightingale (2015) features the Italian folk singer Giuditta Scorcelletti and her husband producer/guitarist Alessandro Boingi, with lyrics by David George. AMISTAD (2018) featured performances by musician friends he met mostly in his new home in Mexico. They are Pedro Cartas (violin), Joe Powers (harmonica), Dan Nicholas (guitar), Billy White (guitar)and David Mendoza-Diaz (guitar), and Alfredo Muro (guitar)

In 2019, Triope, a classical trio in Korea released The Most Beloved Melodies of Michael Hoppe CD arranged by Sehwan Park, and performed by Jiyoung Yun (violin) and Youngmin Kim (cello) with Sehwan Park (piano).

Discography
 1984 - Misunderstood soundtrack 
 1987 - Eyes Of The Wind CD Video 
 1988 - Quiet Storms: Romances for Flute and Harp 
 1989 - Homeland 
 1993 - The Yearning-Romances for Alto Flute, with Tim Wheater
 1994 - The Dreamer-Romances for Alto Flute Vol. 2, with Tim Wheater
 1996 - Simple Pleasures  Produced by George Daly
 1996 - Wind Songs, with Tim Wheater
 1997 - The Poet: Romances for Cello, with Martin Tillman
 1998 - The Unforgetting Heart, with Harold Moses and Tim Wheater
 1998 - Tea for Two, with Tommy Eyre and Scarlet Rivera
 1998 - Lullabies & Childhood Dreams 
 1999 - Afterglow, Chordially Yours Music, AFIM Indie Award Winner, Crossroads Music Award, with Martin Tillman and Tim Wheater
 2000 - Oboe and Cor Anglais 
 2000 - Beloved, A Musical Tribute to the Queen Mother
 2001 - The Lover, with Tim Wheater (Visionary Award)
 2002 - The HeartAid Project, a 9/11 benefit piano collection
 2002 - Dreams That Cannot Die, Longfellow's poems set to music narrated by Layne Longfellow
 2003 - Wind and Waves-The Journey, with Tim Wheater, Chris Bleth and Stephan Liebold
 2003 - Solace, Grammy nomination, Visionary Award, 30 Greatest New Age  Albums of All Time
with Prague Symphony, Martin Tillman, Heidi Fielding, Dwain Briggs, Kenton Youngstrom, Harold Moses, Eugene Fodor, Andrea Bauer, and Vangelis.
 2005 - How Do I Love Thee?, Love poems with narration by Michael York
 2006 - Requiem, Hearts of Space Records, with Heidi Fielding and Dwain Briggs
 2007 - Romances For Solo Piano 
 2009 - Nostalgie"-Romances for Harmonica, with Joe Powers
 2010 - Tapestry
 2010 - Two Eagles Soaring Haiku with narration by poet Brett Brady 
 2010 - Far Away... Romances for Koto with Mitsuki Dazai. Rereleased in 2016 with extra titles
 2010 - Prayers - A Personal Selection read by Michael York (Audie Award nomination)
 2010 - Agnus Dei - Religious songs sung by Dwain Briggs
 2013 -  Grace with Martin Tillmann (cello), AnDee Compton (contralto), Celeste Godin (soprano) Alyssa Park (violin), Michael Hoppe (keyboards and vocals). Artwork/photography by Rebecca Hoppe. (Top Pick by reviewer Kathy Parsons)
 2013 - Rarities Vol. 1 (MP3 Downloads only) Artwork/photography by Rebecca Hoppé
 2014 - Serenity, Viola and Keyboard Improvisations with Harold Moses. Artwork/photography by Rebecca Hoppé (Top Pick by reviewer Kathy Parsons)
 2014 - Beautiful Dreams 2-CD set. Best of Michael Hoppé (Released in South Korea) Photography by Rebecca Hoppé
 2015 - Nightingale songs by Michael Hoppe sung by Giuditta with lyrics by David George. Artwork/photography by Rebecca Hoppé (Top Pick by reviewer Kathy Parsons)
 2016 - Sands of Time 2-CD set. Best of Michael Hoppé (Released in Taiwan) Photography by Rebecca Hoppé
 2017 -  Solace first time in vinyl format, Limited Deluxe Box Set (Released in Taiwan) Photography by Rebecca Hoppé
 2017 -  Romances For Solo Piano  first time in vinyl format, Limited Deluxe Box Set (Released in Taiwan) Photography by Rebecca Hoppé
 2018 - AMISTAD ("Friendship") by Michael Hoppe & Friends. Featuring Pedro Cartas, Joe Powers, Dan Nicholas, Billy White, Alfredo Muro, and David Mandoza-Diaz (Top Pick by reviewer Kathy Parsons)
 2020 - Peace & Reconciliation Choral works including “Requiem for Peace & Reconciliation“ Ryan Holder (Conductor) Sedona Academy of Chamber Singers  and Tetra String Quartet (Top Pick by reviewer Kathy Parsons) and ZMR nomination.
 2021 "By Myself" solo piano
  2021  "Beneath Mexican Stars" featuring a string orchestral version of the title track, and performances by Joe Powers (harmonica), and David Mendoza (violin) Photography by Michael Hoppé 
2022 "Love Remains" an orchestral version, violin, and solo piano versions.

References

External links
 [ Allmusic.com]
 Michael Hoppé website
 Michael Hoppé featuring the world premiere of Requiem for Peace & Reconciliation

English composers
English new-age musicians
Living people
1944 births